The name Afghānistān (Afġānestān ;  Afġānistān ) means "land of the Afghans", which originates from the ethnonym Afghan. Historically, the name Afghan mainly designated Pashtuns, the largest ethnic group of Afghanistan. The earliest reference to the name is found in the 10th-century geography book known as Hudud al-'Alam. The last part of the name, -stān is a Persian suffix for "place".

In the early 19th century, Afghan politicians adopted the name Afghanistan for the entire Durrani Empire after its English translation had already appeared in various treaties with Qajarid Persia and British India. The first time the word Afghanistan was officially used was during signing of Treaty of Gandamak, after defeat of Afghan Emir Yaqoob Khan during Second Anglo-Afghan War. 

In 1857, in his review of J.W. Kaye's The Afghan War, Friedrich Engels describes "Afghanistan" as:

Afghanistan was officially recognized as a sovereign state by the international community after the Anglo-Afghan Treaty of 1919 was signed.

The coined term of Afghanistan came into place in 1855, during the reign of Dost Mohammad Khan while he was forging his campaigns to re-unite Afghanistan following its 70 year civil war with the Barakzai-Durrani feud following the execution of Wazir Fateh Khan Barakzai.

Afghanization

It is widely acknowledged that the terms "Pashtun" and Afghan are synonyms, a fact that is mentioned in the 17th-century poetry of Pashtun national poet Khushal Khan Khattak:

Pashtunization (Afghanization) has been going on in the region (modern Afghanistan and West Pakistan) since at least the 8th century. It is a process of a cultural or linguistic change in which something non-Pashtun becomes Pashtun.

Afghan dynasties

According to Ta'rikh-i Yamini (author being secretary of Mahmud of Ghazni), Afghans enrolled in Sabuktigin's Ghaznavid Empire in the 10th century as well as in the later Ghurid Kingdom (1148–1215). From the beginning of the Turko-Afghan Khalji dynasty in 1290, Afghans are becoming more recognized in history among the Delhi Sultanate of India. The later Lodi dynasty and Sur dynasty of Delhi were both made up of Afghans, whose rule stretched to as far as what is now Bangladesh in the east. Other Afghan dynasties emerged during the 18th century, namely the Hotak dynasty and the Durrani Empire which covered huge swathes of Central and South Asia.

Early references to Afghanistan

The word Afghan is mentioned in the form of Abgan in the third century CE by the Sassanians and as Avagana (Afghana) in the 6th century CE by Indian astronomer Varahamihira. A people called the Afghans are mentioned several times in a 10th-century geography book, Hudud al-'alam, particularly where a reference is made to a village: "Saul, a pleasant village on a mountain. In it live Afghans."

Al-Biruni referred to them in the 11th century as various tribes living on the western frontier mountains of the Indus River. Ibn Battuta, a famous Moroccan scholar visiting the region in 1333, writes: "We travelled on to Kabul, formerly a vast town, the site of which is now occupied by a village inhabited by a tribe of Persians called Afghans. They hold mountains and defiles and possess considerable strength, and are mostly highwaymen. Their principle mountain is called Kuh Sulayman."

The earliest mention of the term "Afghanistan" appears in the 13th century in Tarikh nama-i-Herat of Sayf ibn Muhammad ibn Yaqub al-Herawi, mentioning it as a country between Khorasan and Hind, paying tributes to the country of Shamsuddin.

Furthermore the name "Afghanistan" is mentioned in writing by the 16th century Mughal ruler Babur, referring to a territory south of Kabulistan. {{Quote|"The road from Khorasān leads by way of Kandahār. It is a straight level road, and does not go through any hill-passes... In the country of Kābul there are many and various tribes. Its valleys and plains are inhabited by Tūrks, Aimāks, and Arabs. In the city and the greater part of the villages, the population consists of Tājiks* (Sarts). Many other of the villages and districts are occupied by Pashāis, Parāchis, Tājiks, Berekis, and Afghans. In the hill-country to the west, reside the Hazāras and Nukderis. Among the Hazāra and Nukderi tribes, there are some who speak the Moghul language. In the hill-country to the north-east lies Kaferistān, such as Kattor and Gebrek. To the south is Afghanistān.|Babur|1525}}

The name "Afghanistan" is also mentioned many times in the writings of the 16th century historian, Muhammad Qasim Hindu Shah (Ferishta), and many others.

The coined term of Afghanistan came into place in 1855, during the reign of Dost Mohammad Khan while he was forging his campaigns to re-unite Afghanistan following its 70 year civil war with the Barakzai-Durrani feud following the execution of Wazir Fateh Khan Barakzai.

Last Afghan empire

Regarding the modern sovereign state of Afghanistan, the Encyclopædia Britannica, Encyclopædia Iranica, and others explain that the political history of Afghanistan begins in 1709 with the rise of the Hotaki dynasty, which was established by Mir Wais Hotak who is regarded as "Mirwais Neeka" ("Mirwais the grandfather").

The Encyclopaedia of Islam states:
 British India eventually became Pakistan, India and Bangladesh.

Modern names

Modern terms for Afghanistan and Afghan'' in relevant modern languages:

See also
List of country name etymologies
History of Afghanistan
Names of Khyber Pakhtunkhwa
Pashtunistan

Notes

References 

History of Afghanistan
Afghanistan

es:Etimología de Afganistán
lv:Afganistānas nosaukums